The Archdeacon of Huntingdon and Wisbech is a senior ecclesiastical officer in the Diocese of Ely. The archdeacon is responsible for some clergy discipline and pastoral care in the Archdeaconry of Huntingdon and Wisbech.

History
The Archdeaconry of Huntingdon was a part of the Diocese of Lincoln from (at the latest) the early 12th century. As such it is the oldest continually occupied Archdeaconry in England. The archdeaconry was moved to Ely diocese by Order in Council on 30 May 1837. The archdeaconry of Wisbech was created from several deaneries not already in an archdeaconry, by Order in Council on 5 February 1915. , appointments to the Wisbech archdeaconry ceased and Huntingdon archdeaconry was renamed to the present Archdeaconry of Huntingdon and Wisbech.

List of archdeacons

High Medieval
bef. 1092–1110 (d.): Nicholas (Archdeacon of Cambridge, Huntingdon and Hertford; also called archdeacon of Lincoln)
bef. 1123–aft. 1156: Henry of Huntingdon
bef. 1166–aft. 1160: Hugh (disputed)
bef. 1166–bef. 1187: Nicholas de Sigillo
bef. 1192–aft. 1204: Robert de Hardres
bef. 1206–bef. 1214 (res.): William de Cornhill
bef. 1214–aft. 1223 (res.): Robert de Hailes/of Hailes
bef. 1223–bef. 1228: Philip de Fauconberg
bef. 1230–bef. 1239: Gilbert de Tantone
bef. 1240–aft. 1245: William de Arundel
bef. 1246–?: T.
bef. 1247–aft. 1253: Robert de Hicche
bef. 1255–aft. 1254: R. (disputed)
bef. 1256–aft. 1275: Roger of Raveningham
bef. 1277–aft. 1282: William of Newark
bef. 1287–: Roger Martival
15 March 1295–? (dep.): John de Colonna (papal provision reversed after collation)
26 December 1295–bef. 1308 (d.): Walter Wutton/of Wootton

Late Medieval
22 May 1308–bef. 1309 (d.): Arnald de le Breto
14 August 1309–bef. 1318 (deprived): Guicard de le Breto (deprived for plurality)
1318–1327 (res.): James Berkeley
1329–bef. 1337 (d.): Richard Brinchesle
4 July 1337 – 1361 (res.): William Whittlesey
1344: Pedro Cardinal Gòmez de Barroso (ineffective provision; cardinal-bishop of Sabina)
16 October–October 1361 (d.): Fortanerius Vassalli OFM, Patriarch of Grado
aft. 1362–?: John Swynle/Swynlegh
May 1386: John Lincoln of Grimsby (probably ineffective royal grant)
1386–24 February 1394 (exch.): William Welborne
24 February 1394–aft. 1413: Eudo Zouche/la Zouche
24 March–22 July 1414 (d.): John Tibbay
26 July 1414–bef. 1421 (res.): Richard Hethe
15 December 1421–?: William Lassells
bef. 1447–bef. 1462 (d.): Richard Morsby
20 February 1462–bef. 1464 (d.): Richard Hayman
25 September 1464–March 1475 (d.): Vincent Clement
27 March 1475 – 1478 (res.): John Morton
13 June 1478 – 1493 (res.): John Blyth
17 February–28 July 1494 (res.): Thomas Hutton
28 July 1494–bef. 1496: Robert Sherborne
5 March 1496–bef. April 1496 (res.): Christopher Urswick
28 April 1496 – 1502 (res.): William Warham
10 July 1502–bef. 1512 (d.): John Foster
1 December 1512 – 1514 (res.): John Constable
3 June 1514–bef. November 1514 (res.): William Atwater

18 November 1514 – 1523 (res.): Richard Rawlins
12 September 1523 – 1541 (res.): William Knight

Early modern
5 April 1542–July 1543 (d.): Richard Gwent
27 July 1543–bef. 1560 (deprived): Anthony Draycot (deprived)
28 September 1560 – 1567 (d.): Robert Beaumont
25 December 1567–bef. 1576 (res.): John Bullingham
29 October 1576–bef. 1612 (d.): Robert Condall
23 August 1612–bef. 1615 (d.): Nathan Gifford
1 December 1615 – 1621 (res.): William Laud
26 April 1622–June 1633 (d.): Owen Gwyn
12 January 1634 – 22 August 1649 (d.): Richard Holdsworth
19 November 1649 – 18 March 1665 (res.): Peter Mews
18 March 1666 – 4 March 1667 (d.): William Johnson
27 April 1667–bef. 1669 (d.): Henry Downhall
29 March 1670–bef. 1673 (d.): Richard Perrinchief
5 September 1673 – 14 May 1701 (res.): John Hammond
15 May 1701 – 1720 (res.): White Kennett (also Bishop of Peterborough from 1718)
15 April 1721–bef. 1725 (res.): John Sturges
12 August 1725 – 17 March 1747 (d.): William Lunn
28 March 1747 – 3 February 1757 (d.): Timothy Neve
22 April 1757 – 31 January 1770 (d.): Charles Jenner
23 February 1770 – 8 September 1773 (d.): Nicholas Cholwell
1 January 1774 – 22 February 1794 (d.): Michael Tyson
16 April 1794 – 1812 (res.): Thomas Parkinson
4 April 1812 – 1814 (res.): Thomas Middleton
5 July 1814 – 5 February 1828 (d.): James Hook
25 February 1828 – 9 February 1856 (d.): John Banks Hollingworth
On 30 May 1837, the archdeaconry was moved from Lincoln diocese to the Diocese of Ely.
22 March 1856 – 16 March 1870 (res.): The Hon Henry Yorke

Late modern
1870–1874 (res.): Francis McDougall
1874–18 March 1915 (d.): Gerald Vesey
1915–28 September 1921 (d.): Thomas Hodgson
1921–1943 (ret.): Kenneth Knowles (afterwards archdeacon emeritus)
1943–1947 (res.): William Uthwatt (afterwards archdeacon emeritus)
1947–1955 (ret.): James Jones
1954–1965 (ret.): Arthur Royle
1965–1975 (res.): Dennis Page
1975–1977 (res.): David Young
1978–1996 (ret.): Richard Sledge
1997–2004 (res.): John Beer (also {acting?} Archdeacon of Wisbech from 2003)
, the archdeaconry was renamed from Huntingdon to Huntingdon and Wisbech.
2005April 2022 (ret.): Hugh McCurdy
25 September 2022present: Richard Harlow

Archdeacons of Wisbech
Wisbech was a separate archdeaconry from 1915 until 2004.
1915–6 January 1916 (d.): Colin Campbell
1916–1923 (res.): James Srawley
1924–1945 (res.): George Ward
1945–1953 (res.): Seiriol Evans
1953–1964 (res.): John Pelloe
1965–6 November 1978 (d.): George Fox
1979–1984 (res.): William Patterson
1984–1993 (res.): David Fleming
1995–December 2002 (ret.): Jim Rone
2003–2004 (res.): John Beer (Acting?)
, the archdeaconry lapsed or ceased.

References

Sources

Lists of Anglicans
 
Lists of English people